Eleocharis mamillata is a species of flowering plant belonging to the family Cyperaceae.

Its native range is Europe to China, Subarctic America to Northern USA.

References

mamillata